Charles Calvin Rogers (September 6, 1929 – September 21, 1990) was a US Army officer and a recipient of the highest military decoration in the United States, the Medal of Honor, for his actions during the Vietnam War.

Biography
Charles Rogers joined the US Army through the Army ROTC program at West Virginia State College (now West Virginia State University), Institute, West Virginia, in 1952, and by 1968 was serving as a lieutenant colonel in command of 1st Battalion, 5th Field Artillery Regiment, 1st Infantry Division in Vietnam. On November 1, 1968, during Operation Toan Thang II, 1/5th Artillery was manning Fire Support Base Rita near the Fishhook region of the Cambodian border when it came under heavy attack. Rogers rallied his men in the defense of the base and, despite being several times wounded, continued to lead the battalion until the attack was repulsed. For his actions during the battle, Rogers was nominated for the Medal of Honor. His nomination was approved and, on May 14, 1970, Rogers and 11 other servicemen were presented with Medals of Honor by US President Richard Nixon at a ceremony in the White House.

After recovering Rogers attended the US Army War College and received an M.S. degree from Shippensburg State College. He rose to the rank of major general before he left the army in 1984. He later became a Baptist minister, serving U.S. troops stationed in Germany. After a brief battle with prostate cancer, he died in Munich, Germany, at 61 and is buried in Arlington National Cemetery, United States.

Medal of Honor citation
Rogers' official Medal of Honor citation reads:

For conspicuous gallantry and intrepidity in action at the risk of his life above and beyond the call of duty. Lt. Col. Rogers, Field Artillery, distinguished himself in action while serving as commanding officer, 1st Battalion, during the defense of a forward fire support base. In the early morning hours, the fire support base was subjected to a concentrated bombardment of heavy mortar, rocket and rocket propelled grenade fire. Simultaneously the position was struck by a human wave ground assault, led by sappers who breached the defensive barriers with bangalore torpedoes and penetrated the defensive perimeter. Lt. Col. Rogers with complete disregard for his safety moved through the hail of fragments from bursting enemy rounds to the embattled area. He aggressively rallied the dazed artillery crewmen to man their howitzers and he directed their fire on the assaulting enemy. Although knocked to the ground and wounded by an exploding round, Lt. Col. Rogers sprang to his feet and led a small counterattack force against an enemy element that had penetrated the howitzer positions. Although painfully wounded a second time during the assault, Lt. Col. Rogers pressed the attack killing several of the enemy and driving the remainder from the positions. Refusing medical treatment, Lt. Col. Rogers reestablished and reinforced the defensive positions. As a second human wave attack was launched against another sector of the perimeter, Lt. Col. Rogers directed artillery fire on the assaulting enemy and led a second counterattack against the charging forces. His valorous example rallied the beleaguered defenders to repulse and defeat the enemy onslaught. Lt. Col. Rogers moved from position to position through the heavy enemy fire, giving encouragement and direction to his men. At dawn the determined enemy launched a third assault against the fire base in an attempt to overrun the position. Lt. Col. Rogers moved to the threatened area and directed lethal fire on the enemy forces. Seeing a howitzer inoperative due to casualties, Lt. Col. Rogers joined the surviving members of the crew to return the howitzer to action. While directing the position defense, Lt. Col. Rogers was seriously wounded by fragments from a heavy mortar round which exploded on the parapet of the gun position. Although too severely wounded to physically lead the defenders, Lt. Col. Rogers continued to give encouragement and direction to his men in the defeating and repelling of the enemy attack. Lt. Col. Rogers' dauntless courage and heroism inspired the defenders of the fire support base to the heights of valor to defeat a determined and numerically superior enemy force. His relentless spirit of aggressiveness in action are in the highest traditions of the military service and reflects great credit upon himself, his unit, and the U.S. Army.

See also

List of Medal of Honor recipients
List of Medal of Honor recipients for the Vietnam War

References

References 

1929 births
1990 deaths
United States Army Medal of Honor recipients
Recipients of the Legion of Merit
Recipients of the Distinguished Flying Cross (United States)
Burials at Arlington National Cemetery
People from Fayette County, West Virginia
United States Army generals
Military personnel from West Virginia
United States Army personnel of the Vietnam War
Vietnam War recipients of the Medal of Honor
Deaths from prostate cancer
20th-century Baptist ministers from the United States